Dren is a village located in the municipality of Leposavić, in Kosovo. According to 2009 estimates for the 2011 Kosovan census, it has 129 inhabitants, of whom the majority are Serbs.

Notes

References

Villages in Leposavić